The Connection is the seventh studio album by American rock band Papa Roach. It was released on October 2, 2012, through Eleven Seven Music. The album was produced by Sixx:A.M. vocalist James Michael, who co-produced the band's previous full-length album Metamorphosis, and Goldfinger vocalist John Feldmann. The first single, "Still Swingin'", was released on July 24, 2012.

A lyric video to the song "Before I Die" was released on Papa Roach's YouTube channel on November 15, 2012. On November 19, 2012, The Connection was released as a vinyl record, making it the first Papa Roach album to be released in that format.

The album features several songs with electronic influences. Some tracks on the album feature a return to the nu metal style rapping vocals of the band's early releases.

Background
Jacoby Shaddix has described the album as a "rediscovery of the basic elements of Papa Roach." He states: "We kind of went back and looked at the history of our band and really thought about… Creatively, what evolutions have we gone through? When we came in, it was, like, metal and hip-hop and nu-metal, and then we kind of got more into straight-ahead rock and then we added pop elements to our band. So this record just encompasses everything we’ve done from the beginning to where we are currently as a band; it just kind of connects the dots of all the elements of our sound over the years." "There's some hip-hop, more keyboards than before, sound loops, textures—it's dynamic, diverse and vulnerable. That is Papa Roach. We have never sounded better," said Shaddix.

Regarding the album's title, Shaddix stated it was one of many different titles the band went through. "We always just kept coming back to ‘The Connection,’" stated Shaddix. "What ‘The Connection’ means to us, it’s our connection to the music, it’s the connection of this music to the fans, it’s the connection that we make onstage with our music, it’s the connection from fan-to-fan on the social Internet marketing media world."

Track listing

Sales 
"The Connection", sold 22,000 copies in the United States in its first week of release to land at position No. 17 on The Billboard 200 chart. The CD arrived in stores on October 2 via Eleven Seven Music. It charted higher and sold more than Papa Roach's previous album, 2010's "Time For Annihilation ... On the Road & On the Record", which opened with 16,000 units to debut at position No. 23 on The Billboard 200 chart, but underperformed compared to the band's 2009 CD, "Metamorphosis", which premiered at #8 with nearly 44,000 copies.

"The Connection" has sold more than 109,000 copies in the US as of 2015.

Reception 

The album has received generally mixed reviews, with a 62% rating on Metacritic.

Allmusic gave the album 3 stars out of 5 saying: "[the album strikes] a balance between [the band's] early roots as a nu-metal/rap-rock outfit and its more recent interest in '80s-style Sunset Strip hard rock... The Connection includes some creatively slick sounds that flow from buzzy, processed distortion to pulsating, atmospheric electronic flourishes."

Personnel
Jacoby Shaddix - lead vocals
 Jerry Horton - guitar, backing vocals
 Tobin Esperance - bass, backing vocals
 Tony Palermo - drums

Chart positions
Album - Billboard

References

Papa Roach albums
2012 albums
Eleven Seven Label Group albums